David Atkinson may refer to:

David Atkinson (baritone) (1921–2012), Canadian actor and singer
David Atkinson (bishop) (born 1943), British bishop and author
David Atkinson (politician) (1940–2012), Conservative British Member of Parliament for Bournemouth East 
David W. Atkinson (born 1948), Canadian academic and President of Grant MacEwan University
David Rice Atchison (1807–1886), sometimes spelled Atkinson, United States senator
David Atkinson (footballer) (born 1993), English footballer

See also
Atkinson (surname)